= Georgi Georgiev (footballer, born 1948) =

Bulgarian footballer

Personal information
- Date of birth: 8 September 1948 (age 78)
- Place of birth: Sofia, Bulgaria
- Position: Striker

Senior career*
| Years | Team | Apps | (Gls) |
| 1969?–1970 | Chernomorets Burgas | | |
| 1970–1972 | Slavia Sofia | | |

International career
| 1969–1971 | Bulgaria | 2 | (0) |
- * Club domestic league appearances and goals

Georgi Georgiev (Bulgarian: Георги Георгиев, born 8 September 1948) is a retired Bulgarian football striker.
